The following contains the team squads for the Beijing 2008 Summer Olympics.

Canada
The roster for the Canada national baseball team was as follows.
Manager: Terry Puhl, Greg Hamilton.
Coaches: Denis Boucher (Pitching coach), Rob Ducey.

Pete Orr was originally named to the team, but pulled out when he was called up to the major league roster of the Washington Nationals. He was replaced by 22-year-old Emmanuel Garcia. Scott Richmond was also removed from the team when he was called up by the Toronto Blue Jays. Pitcher James Avery was named as a replacement.

China
The roster for the China national baseball team was as follows.
Manager: Jim Lefebvre.
Coaches: Steven Ontiveros (Pitching coach).

Chinese Taipei
The roster for the Chinese Taipei national baseball team was as follows.
Manager:  (La New Bears).
Coaches: Hsieh Chang-Heng (Chinatrust Whales),  La New Bears), Kung Jung-Tang (National Training Team).

On August 13, 2008, right before the Chinese Taipei vs. Netherlands match, Chang Tai-Shan was banned by the IBAF on showing up in the Olympic Games after he was tested positive for a banned substance. The Chinese Taipei National baseball team could only finish the Olympics with the remaining 23 players.

Cuba
The roster for the Cuba national baseball team was as follows.
Manager: Antonio Pacheco.

Yunieski Maya and Yulieski González were originally named, but were replaced with Miguel Lahera and Elier Sánchez.

Japan
The roster for the Japan national baseball team was as follows.
Manager: Senichi Hoshino.
Coaches: Kōichi Tabuchi, Koji Yamamoto, Yutaka Oono.

South Korea
The roster for the South Korea national baseball team was as follows.
Manager: Kim Kyung-Moon (Doosan Bears).
Coaches:  (Samsung Lions),  (Doosan Bears), Kim Ki-Tae (Yomiuri Giants).

Im Tae-Hoon had been originally named, but was replaced with Yoon Suk-Min.

Netherlands
The roster for the Netherlands national baseball team was a follows.|

Manager: Robert Eenhoorn
Coaches: Brian Farley – Pitching coach, Wim Martinus – 1st base coach, Jack Hubbard – 3rd base coach, Paul van den Oever – Coach.

United States
The roster for the United States national baseball team was as follows.
General Manager: Bob Watson
Manager: Davey Johnson

Notes

Team squads
2008